Pepple is a surname.  It may refer to:

 Adawari Pepple, Nigerian politician
 Amal Pepple (born 1949), Nigerian civil servant
 Aribim Pepple (born 2002), professional soccer player
 Fubara Manilla Pepple (died 1792), king of Bonny
 George Oruigbiji Pepple (1849–1888), king of Bonny